I Hope It Lands is an album by the American band Thinking Fellers Union Local 282. It was released in 1996 through Communion Records.

Critical reception
The Orlando Sentinel called the album "another mad collection of brief sound collages, twisted pop tunes and fractured chunks of art-rock." The Santa Fe New Mexican concluded that "their songs are like singing telegrams from the distant cosmic spring that flows down to both Sonic Youth and Captain Beefheart." Trouser Press declared that "the band has the miraculous group-mind of a flock of birds, and the record flows like nothing they’ve ever done before—even the little noise-twiddles are part of the record’s grand mid-air arc."

Track listing

Personnel 
Thinking Fellers Union Local 282
Mark Davies – vocals, guitar, banjo
Anne Eickelberg – vocals, bass guitar, piano
Brian Hageman – vocals, guitar, mandolin, tape
Jay Paget – drums, percussion, keyboards
Hugh Swarts – vocals, guitar
Production and additional personnel
Gibbs Chapman – production, recording
Margaret Murray – design
Thinking Fellers Union Local 282 – production, recording

References

External links 
 

1996 albums
Thinking Fellers Union Local 282 albums